South Bend is an unincorporated community located within South Bend Township, Armstrong County, Pennsylvania, United States.

History
A post office called South Bend was established in 1848 and remained in operation until 1959.

References

Unincorporated communities in Armstrong County, Pennsylvania
Unincorporated communities in Pennsylvania